Russian invasion may refer to:

 Russo-Polish War (1654–1667)
 Smolensk War, 1632–1634
 Sack of Baturyn, 1708
 Russo-Circassian War, 1763–1864
 Liquidation of the Zaporozhian Sich, 1775
 Annexation of Crimea by the Russian Empire, 1783
 Partitions of Poland, 1772–1795
 Caucasian War, 1817–1864
 Russian invasion of Manchuria, 1900
 Russian occupation of Tabriz, 1911
 Russian invasion of East Prussia (1914)
 Soviet–Ukrainian War (1917–1920)
 Red Army invasion of Georgia, 1921
 Soviet invasion of Poland, 1939
 Winter War, 1939
 Hungarian Revolution of 1956
 Warsaw Pact invasion of Czechoslovakia, 1968
 Soviet–Afghan War, 1979–1989
 First Chechen War, 1994–1997
 Second Chechen War, 1999–2000
 Russo-Georgian War, 2008
 Russo-Ukrainian War, 2014–
 2022 Russian invasion of Ukraine

See also
 Related to the Russo Ukrainian War
 Annexation of Crimea by the Russian Federation, 2014–
 War in Donbas (2014–2022)
 2021–2022 Russian Ukrainian crisis
 List of wars involving Russia
 Soviet invasion (disambiguation)
 Invasion of Russia (disambiguation)
 Russian Expeditionary Force (disambiguation)